Gerardo Rozín (18 June 1970 – 11 March 2022) was an Argentine journalist, producer and radio and television presenter.

Career
Rozín recounted that he was initiated into journalism by a friend when he was 12 years old.

Rozín was the producer of the television program , hosted by Nicolás Repetto, in which he was also in charge of the segment "The Animal Question" that later continued as an independent program.

From 2015 to 2017, he co-hosted  from Monday to Friday, firstly with Carina Zampini, and then in the last season with Argentine model Zaira Nara.

Personal life
Rozín died in Buenos Aires on 11 March 2022, at the age of 51. He had been diagnosed with a malignant brain tumour a year prior.

References

1970 births
2022 deaths
Argentine Jews
Argentine journalists
Argentine television journalists
Argentine television presenters
Deaths from brain tumor
Deaths from cancer in Argentina
Neurological disease deaths in Argentina